The Sittaceni were an ancient people dwelling along the Palus Maeotis in antiquity.  Strabo describes them as living among the Maeotae, Sindi, Dandarii, Toreatae, Agri, Arrechi, Tarpetes, Obidiaceni, Dosci, and Aspurgiani, among others (xi. 2. 11). Sittaceni is one of the Maeotae tribes, who lived in the 1st millennium BC on the east and the south-eastern coast of the Azov sea. In the Great Soviet Encyclopedia, they were concluded to have been one of the ancestors to the Circassians. In the 4th–3rd centuries BC many of the Maeotae tribes were included into the Bosporan Kingdom.

References

Strabo's book 11 on-line
 Encyclopédie ou dictionnaire raisonné des sciences, des arts et des métiers

Peoples of the Caucasus
History of the North Caucasus
Ancient history of the Caucasus
Kabardino-Balkaria
Ancient Circassian tribes